Fiq was a Syrian town in the Golan Heights that administratively belonged to Quneitra Governorate. It was the administrative center of the Fiq District, the southern district the Golan. Fiq was evacuated during and after the Six-Day War in June 1967. The Israeli settlement of Kibbutz Afik was built close by.

History
Fiq was an ancient town, covering about 100 dunams on a tell (archaeological mound). The surveys and limited excavations undertaken at the site have produced a small number of sherds from the Middle Bronze Age II, Hellenistic, and Middle Roman periods, whereas most of the finds were dated to the Byzantine, Umayyad, Abbasid and Mamluk periods.

Late antiquity
Fiq was identified by 4th century writer Eusebius with biblical Aphek. 

During late antiquity, Fiq had a mixed population of Christians, Jews and pagans. Many inscriptions in Latin and Greek have been found at the site. One of these inscriptions may allude to a Psalm passage, and another, engraved on basalt and thought to have been a part of a church or chapel dedication, mentions a bishop, a presbyter, and a deacon. Jewish presence at Aphek is attested by Mishnaic and Talmudic sources.

One notable discovery from Fiq is a column adorned with a seven-branched menorah and bearing the inscription, "I am Judah the cantor," in Aramaic. It is thought that this column once stood in a local synagogue of the Byzantine period. After being discovered for the first time in Fiq during the 19th century, it vanished for several decades before being rediscovered by Israeli soldiers in a Syrian cemetery close to Quenitra. Today, it is on display at the Golan Archeological Museum.

Early Muslim period
9th century historian Al-Baladhuri lists Aphek among the villages and forts captured during the Arab conquest in 638 CE. In the 11th century, Yaqut mentioned Aphek in his geography and lamented the fact that residents now called it "Fiq".

Fiq was located on one of the few routes connecting the Galilee and the Golan Heights, all part of the very important network of roads between Egypt and Syria. The lower part of the road followed the "Ascent of Fiq" (Arabic: 'Aqabat Fiq). Once it reached the plateau, the road passed through different villages, the branch going through Fiq leading eastwards to the Hauran region rather than northeastwards to Damascus.

An inscription found near Fiq dating to 692 credits the Umayyad caliph Abd al-Malik and his uncle Yahya ibn al-Hakam for leveling the "aqaba" (presumably Aqabat Fiq) for the inauguration of a new road connecting the Umayyad capital Damascus with Jerusalem. It is the oldest known Arabic inscription acknowledging the building of a road during the Islamic period.

Ayyubid period
The Ayyubids built a caravanserai at Aqabat Fiq in the early 13th century called Khan al-'Aqabah, whose ruins are still visible. Around 1225, during Ayyubid rule, the Syrian geographer Yaqut al-Hamawi noted that the convent of Dayr Fiq was much venerated by Christians, and still frequented by travellers.

Ottoman period
In 1596 Fiq appeared in the Ottoman tax registers as part of the nahiya of Jawlan Garbi in the Qada of Hauran. It had an entirely Muslim population consisting of 16 households and 9 bachelors. Taxes were paid on wheat, barley, summer crops, olive trees, goats and/or beehives.

In 1806, the German explorer Seetzen found that Fiq had 100 houses made of basalt, four of them were inhabited by Christians and the rest by Muslims. In 1875, the French explorer Victor Guérin found that Fiq was divided into four quarters, each administered by its own sheik. Most of the homes contained remnants of ancient buildings. The village had abundant of fresh water. When Gottlieb Schumacher surveyed the area in the 1880s, he described Fiq as a large village with about 400 people. It had around 160 "tolerably" well-built stone houses, but only 90 of those were inhabited.

1967 village
At the time of its depopulation in 1967, the town had a population of approximately 2,800.

Archaeology and possible mention in the Bible
The name Aphek refers to one or several locations mentioned by the Hebrew Bible as the scenes of a number of battles between the Israelites and the Arameans. Most famously, a town near which one or more rulers of Damascus named Ben-hadad, were defeated by the Israelites and in which the Damascene king and his surviving soldiers found a safe place of retreat.

Since the turn of the 20th century the predominant opinion is that the location of all these battles is one and the same, and that the town lay east of the Jordan. Initially it was thought that the name is preserved in the now depopulated village of Fiq near Kibbutz Afik, three miles east of the Sea of Galilee, where an ancient mound, Tel Soreg, had been identified. Excavations by Moshe Kochavi and Pirhiya Beck in 1987-88 have indeed discovered a fortified 9th- and 8th-century BCE settlement, probably Aramean, but Kochavi considered it to be too small to serve the role ascribed to Aphek in the Bible. The site most favoured now by the archaeologists is Tel 'En Gev/Khirbet el-'Asheq, a mound located within Kibbutz Ein Gev, with remains of an Iron Age town and of the Roman-period village of Apheka. The Late Roman village however is identified with Fiq on the plateau above.

Notable people
Hatem Ali, Syrian actor born in Fiq in 1962

References

Bibliography

 (pp. 240–241)

 (p. 206)
 (p. 93)

1967 disestablishments in Syria
Populated places disestablished in 1967
Former populated places on the Golan Heights
Towns in Quneitra Governorate